HMS Opossum (S19) was an  in service with the Royal Navy from 1964 to 1993.

Design and construction

The Oberon class was a direct follow-on of the Porpoise-class, with the same dimensions and external design, but updates to equipment and internal fittings, and a higher grade of steel used for fabrication of the pressure hull.

Displacement was 1,610 tons standard, 2,030 tons full load when surfaced, and 2,410 tons full load when submerged. Propulsion machinery consisted of 2 Admiralty Standard Range 16 VMS diesel generators, and two  electric motors, each driving a  3-bladed propeller at up to 400 rpm. Eight  diameter torpedo tubes were fitted (six facing forward, two aft), with a total payload of 24 torpedoes. The boats were fitted with Type 186 and Type 187 sonars, and an I-band surface search radar. The standard complement was 68: 6 officers, 62 sailors.

Opossum was laid down by Cammell Laird on 21 December 1961, and launched on 23 May 1963. The boat was commissioned into the Royal Navy on 5 June 1964.

Operational history
In 1990, Opossum took part in the bicentennial celebrations at Pitcairn Island, marking the occasion with a two-day visit in September.

Opossum was deployed to the Persian Gulf during the 1991 Gulf War under Operation Granby. On her return to Gosport, she was flying a Jolly Roger; the only indication that the submarine had been involved in deploying and recovering Special Air Service and Special Boat Service personnel.

On 14 July 1993, Opossum (which was travelling on the surface at the time) collided with the fishing vessel Amber Rose off the coast of Scotland.

Decommissioning and fate
On paying off in 1993, the nameplate from Opossum was given to St Edmundsbury council in commemoration of the submarine's association with the town of Bury St. Edmunds.

Heraldry
Admiral of the Fleet Lord Boyce, who commanded Opossum as a lieutenant commander from 1974 to 1976, symbolically commemorated the submarine in his personal coat of arms. For his crest he chose "a Mouse Opossum Argent, the eye ring and claws Azure", while his heraldic motto is "Ipsis Fretis Impedimentis Possum". (illustration)

References

Publications

External links
 HMS Opossum Association

 

Oberon-class submarines of the Royal Navy
Ships built on the River Mersey
1963 ships
Cold War submarines of the United Kingdom
Gulf War ships of the United Kingdom